George M. Kuznets (July 28, 1909 – August 3, 1986) was an American economist. A member of the University of California, Berkeley's department of agricultural and resource economics, he specialized in agricultural economics. Regarded by his peers as a pioneer in quantitative research, Kuznets was appointed a fellow of the American Agricultural Economics Association in 1982, the highest honor of his profession.
He was also elected as a Fellow of the American Statistical Association, in 1960.

Born in into a Jewish family in Kiev, Russian Empire (now in Ukraine), Kuznets moved to the US from Warsaw alone after the death of his mother in 1926 and obtained a Ph.D. in psychometrics from the University of California, Berkeley. His older brother Simon Kuznets was also an economist and won the 1971 Nobel Memorial Prize in Economic Sciences.

References

External links 

1909 births
1986 deaths
Stanford University alumni
20th-century American economists
Fellows of the American Statistical Association
Polish emigrants to the United States